The  is a major river in the northern Kantō region of Japan. Its source is at Mount Sukai on the boundary of the city of Nikkō in Tochigi Prefecture and it empties into the Tone River at the boundary of the city of Koga in Ibaraki Prefecture and the city of Kazo in Saitama Prefecture. It is classed as a First-class river by the Japanese government.

Although the river currently discharges into the Tone River, its original route was via the Edo River into Tokyo Bay. Its route was changed as part of the massive land reclamation and flood control works undertaken by the Tokugawa shogunate in the 17th and 18th centuries.

See also
Ashio Copper Mine

References

External links

国土交通省 関東地方整備局 渡良瀬川河川事務所 (Ministry of Land, Infrastructure, Transport and Tourism (Japan) official page)

 (mouth)

Rivers of Gunma Prefecture
Rivers of Tochigi Prefecture
Rivers of Ibaraki Prefecture
Rivers of Saitama Prefecture
Rivers of Japan
Ashikaga, Tochigi